Robert Lee Neely (born March 22, 1974) is an American actor and former American football tight end who played for the Chicago Bears in the National Football League (NFL). He played college football at Virginia University.

Early life and education 
Neely played all four of his college years at Virginia University. He never redshirted his freshman year, however, most of the staff in the program believed that he should have done so. During his college career, he got injured constantly. He played in only five games in his senior year because of the injuries he obtained. He was very frustrated that he had missed the chance to be a All-ACC tight end. He believed that he deserved the award because he did just as well as the winner. He also claimed that he was the best tight end out there and one of the only 'real' ones. While there, he caught 50 passes for 509 yards. Out of those 50 catches, not even one of them was a touchdown. All of these factors led to him being undrafted.

Professional career 
After college, he was signed to the Chicago Bears as an undrafted free agent. He did not make the final roster. Therefore, he decided to sign with the Miami Dolphins practice squad. About five games into the season, however, the Bears had lost all of their active tight ends due to injuries. They re-signed Neely to their active roster where he was now the starting tight end. During his rookie season, he played in eleven games, starting in five. He caught 9-of-13 passes for 92 yards in the games he played. He suffered a career-ending injury before his second season.

Post career 
Neely currently acts, mainly as a guest star. He has appeared on shows NCIS, Grey's Anatomy, and most recently Rebel.

References

External links
 

1974 births
Living people
American football tight ends
Virginia Cavaliers football players
Chicago Bears players
Miami Dolphins players
Sportspeople from Atlanta